The 1991–92 Boston Bruins season saw the Bruins finish in second place in the Adams Division with a record of 36 wins, 32 losses, and 12 ties for 84 points. They defeated the Buffalo Sabres in seven games in the Division Semi-final and swept the Montreal Canadiens in the Division Finals before being swept themselves in the Wales Conference Finals by the eventual Stanley Cup champion Pittsburgh Penguins.

Regular season

Final standings

Schedule and results

Playoffs

Adams Division Semifinals

Boston Bruins 4, Buffalo Sabres 3

Adams Division Finals

Boston Bruins 4, Montreal Canadiens 0

Wales Conference Finals

Pittsburgh Penguins 4, Boston Bruins 0

Player statistics

Regular season
Scoring

Goaltending

Playoffs
Scoring

Goaltending

Draft picks
Boston's draft picks at the 1991 NHL Entry Draft held at the Buffalo Memorial Auditorium in Buffalo, New York.

References
 Bruins on Hockey Database

Boston Bruins seasons
Boston Bruins
Boston Bruins
Boston Bruins
Boston Bruins
Bruins
Bruins